The slaty finch (Haplospiza rustica) is a bird species in the family Thraupidae (formerly in Emberizidae).

It is found in Central America and the northern Andes. Its natural habitats are subtropical or tropical moist montane forests and heavily degraded former forest.

References

slaty finch
slaty finch
Birds of Central America
Birds of Guatemala
Birds of the Northern Andes
slaty finch
Taxonomy articles created by Polbot
Taxobox binomials not recognized by IUCN